Juvinas is a commune in the Ardèche department in southern France.

Population

Famous features
A meteorite felt in June 1821, on the 15th, whose name therefore became the Juvinas meteorite. It felt in the hamlet of Libonès, at a place called “le Cros du Libonès” (in French). It is a eucrite, coming from Vesta minor planet, the 4th asteroid by size from the main asteroid belt, between Jupiter and Mars. Half of the original recovered fall is still kept in the French national collection of meteorites at MNHN museum, in Paris, France. The remaining was kept in neighborhood family homes, but the lack of transmission of their origin through successive generations ended with the loss, by discarding, of most if not all of these therefore unidentified pieces.

See also
Communes of the Ardèche department

References

Communes of Ardèche
Ardèche communes articles needing translation from French Wikipedia